"Eco-municipality" has a specific meaning. For a more general discussion of the sustainability of cities, see Sustainable city.

An eco-municipality or eco-town is a local government area that has adopted ecological and social justice values in its charter. The development of eco-municipalities stems from changing systems in Sweden, where more than seventy municipal governments have accepted varying principles of sustainability in their operations as well as community-wide decision-making processes. The purpose of these policies is to increase the overall sustainability of the community.

Large scale social movements can influence both community choices and the built environment. Eco-municipalities may be one such movement. Eco-municipalities take a systems approach, based on sustainability principles. The eco-municipality movement is participatory, involving community members in a bottom-up approach. 

The distinction between an eco-municipality and other sustainable development projects (such as green building and alternative energy) is the focus on community involvement and social transformation in a public agency, as well as the use of a holistic systems approach. An eco-municipality is one that recognizes that issues of sustainability are key to all decisions made by government.

History
In 1983 the Övertorneå community of Sweden first adopted an Eco-municipality framework, followed by a formal organization in 1995 (SEKOM).

Framework
In becoming an eco-municipality, cities or towns typically adopt a resolution, based on the Natural Step framework (or Framework for Strategic Sustainable Development (FSSD)), which sets the following objectives:
 Reduce dependence upon fossil fuels.
 Reduce dependence upon synthetic chemicals.
 Reduce encroachment upon nature.
 Better meet human needs fairly and efficiently.

Municipalities adopting framework
Communities in North America, Europe and Africa ranging in size from villages of 300 to cities of 700,000 have become eco-municipalities. In Sweden, over one hundred municipalities have officially become eco-municipalities. They have formed a national association of eco-municipalities to assist one another and work to influence national policy. Whistler, BC, was awarded first place in a United Nations-endorsed international competition for sustainable communities. Its long-term sustainability plan, Whistler 2020, is based on the Natural Step framework.

In Wisconsin, there is a growing eco-municipality movement which began in the Chequamegon Bay region. As of November 2007, twelve local communities had formally adopted eco-municipality resolutions. The resolutions state the community's intention to become an eco-municipality, endorsing the Natural Step sustainability principles and framework as a guide.

In Sweden, more than 70 cities and towns—25 percent of all municipalities in the country—have adopted a common set of "Sustainability Principles" and implemented these systematically throughout their municipal operations. There are now twelve eco-municipalities in the United States and the American Planning Association has adopted sustainability objectives based on the same principles.

See also
 Ecovillage
 Eco-towns
 Green municipalism
 Sustainable city

Notes

References
 James, S. and T. Lahti (2004). The Natural Step for Communities: How Cities and Towns can Change to Sustainable Practices. Gabriola Island, British Columbia: New Society Publishers.

External links
 National Association of Swedish Eco-municipalities Website of SEKOM
 Sustainable Sweden Association Website
 The Natural Step Case study TNS case study on North American Eco-municipality Network
 Sarah James Associates Consulting firm working in the field.
 Wisconsin Chapter of the American Planning Association Eco Municipalities links
 1,000 Friends of Wisconsin page on Eco-Municipalities
 The American Association of Planners policy guide on sustainability.
 Sustain Dane Website on Dane (US)
 Sustainable Lawrence Website on Lawrence (Canada)
 Piscataqua Sustainability Website on Piscataqua (Canada)

Sustainable design
Sustainable communities
Environmental planning
Landscape architecture
Urban studies and planning terminology
Environmental design
Simple living
1980s neologisms
Community building